These are the official results of the Men's 4 × 100 metres event at the 1991 IAAF World Championships in Tokyo, Japan. Their final was held on Sunday September 1, 1991.

Schedule
All times are Japan Standard Time (UTC+9)

Final

Heats
Held on Saturday 1991-08-31

Heat 1

Heat 2

See also
 1990 Men's European Championships 4 × 100 m Relay (Split)
 1992 Men's Olympic 4 × 100 m Relay (Barcelona)
 1993 Men's World Championships 4 × 100 m Relay (Stuttgart)

References
 Results

 
Relays at the World Athletics Championships
4 × 100 metres relay